Carlos Henrique Manzato dos Santos (born 20 August 1982 in Santo André, São Paulo), commonly known as Cahê, is a Brazilian football forward who currently formerly plays for Hong Kong First Division League football club Sun Hei SC in 2009 to 2011.

Honours

Individual
 Hong Kong First Division League top scorer: 2009–10

External links
 Carlos Henrique Manzato Dos Santos at HKFA

Brazilian footballers
Brazilian expatriate footballers
Association football forwards
Sun Hei SC players
Hong Kong First Division League players
Expatriate footballers in Hong Kong
1982 births
Living people
People from Santo André, São Paulo
Footballers from São Paulo (state)